Lectionary 25, designated by siglum ℓ 25 (in the Gregory-Aland numbering) is a Greek manuscript of the New Testament, on vellum leaves. Palaeographically it has been assigned to the 13th-century.

Description 

The codex contains lessons from the Gospels of John, Matthew, Luke lectionary (Evangelistarium), with lacunae. It is written in Greek minuscule letters, on 159 parchment leaves, in 1 column per page, 21-23 lines per page.

It is a palimpsest in some parts, the lower earlier text written partly by minuscule, partly by uncial hand. This text is illegible and still unidentified.

History 

The text of lectionary (later text of palimpsest) was written by Nicephorus at the behest of Nicholas Presbyter. 

The codex was merely examined by Griesbach, Bloomfield, and Henri Omont. Gregory saw it in 1883. 

The manuscript is not cited in the critical editions of the Greek New Testament (UBS3).

Currently the codex is located in the British Library (Harley MS 5650).

See also 

 List of New Testament lectionaries
 Biblical manuscript
 Textual criticism

Notes and references

External links 
 Images at the British Library

Greek New Testament lectionaries
13th-century biblical manuscripts
Harleian Collection